Aequispirella finlayi is a species of sea snail, a marine gastropod mollusk, unassigned in the superfamily Seguenzioidea.

Distribution
This marine species is endemic to New Zealand

References

finlayi
Gastropods described in 1933
Gastropods of New Zealand